Memento Mori (Latin for "Remember that you have to die") is the sixteenth album by Japanese rock band Buck-Tick, released on February 18, 2009. The limited edition came with a DVD of the making of the album. It reached number seven on the Oricon chart with 23,410 copies sold.

Memento Mori continued the concept of a straight "band sound", which Buck-Tick began on Tenshi no Revolver. Satoshi Mishiba of Kinniku Shōjo Tai provides piano on "Katte ni Shiyagare" and "Message".

Track listing

Personnel
Buck-Tick
 Atsushi Sakurai – vocals
 Hisashi Imai – guitar, noise, electronics, chorus
 Hidehiko Hoshino – electric guitar, acoustic guitar, chorus
 Yutaka Higuchi – bass
 Toll Yagami – drums

Additional performers
 Kazutoshi Yokoyama – manipulator, keyboard
 Satoshi Mishiba – Hammond organ, piano on tracks 5 & 7
 Yuiko Tsubokura – chorus on track 7

References

Buck-Tick albums
2009 albums
Japanese-language albums